Hancock Cemetery is a historic cemetery on the Hancock Adams Common, across from the United First Parish Church, in Quincy, Massachusetts, United States. It is named after Reverend John Hancock (1702–1744), father of Founding Father John Hancock.

The cemetery was founded c. 1640 (the date of the earliest documented graves), and is the only tangible remainder of the early settlement of the area.  It was the resting place of Presidents John Adams and John Quincy Adams and their wives, Abigail Adams and Louisa Adams (respectively), before they were moved to the crypt in the United First Parish Church.

The cemetery was listed on the National Register of Historic Places in 1982.

Gallery

See also
 National Register of Historic Places listings in Quincy, Massachusetts

References

External links

 
 Digitized cemetery markers and graves on Google Maps and Google Earth .

Cemeteries on the National Register of Historic Places in Massachusetts
1640 establishments in Massachusetts
Buildings and structures in Quincy, Massachusetts
Cemeteries in Norfolk County, Massachusetts
Tourist attractions in Quincy, Massachusetts
National Register of Historic Places in Quincy, Massachusetts
Cemeteries established in the 17th century